Eija Koskivaara (born 7 May 1965) is a Finnish orienteering competitor and World champion. She won a gold medal at the 1995 World Orienteering Championships in Detmold with the Finnish relay team. She received a silver medal with the relay team in 1993 (West Point), and a bronze medal in 1989 (Skaraborg). She received an individual bronze medal at the 1993 World Championships (Short distance) and a silver medal at the 1995 World Championships (Classic distance).

See also
 Finnish orienteers
 List of orienteers
 List of orienteering events

References

External links
 
 

1965 births
Living people
Finnish orienteers
Female orienteers
Foot orienteers
World Orienteering Championships medalists